The Citroën C-Airdream is a concept car created by the Citroën division of the French car company PSA Peugeot Citroën, first presented at the 2002 Paris Motor Show.  The C-Airdream is designed to be very slender and very aerodynamic.

Overview

The 2-door C-Airdream features an aerodynamic design with an all-glass roof and has a drag coefficient of 0.28. The interior features no foot pedals or a gear lever, with all the resulting drive-by-wire controls located on the steering wheel.

References

External links
Citroën C-Airdream info @ ConceptCarz.com

C-Airdream